Ellie Herman is an American television writer, teacher and blogger, based in Los Angeles, California.

Career
She has written for Melrose Place, My So-Called Life, Desperate Housewives, Jericho, Century City, That Was Then, Significant Others, Relativity, Chicago Hope, Doogie Howser, M.D., Northern Exposure, Gabriel's Fire, Newhart, Moon Over Miami and The Riches.

She has a teaching blog, "Gatsby In L.A.," about a teacher's journey through the classrooms of Los Angeles.

Awards
In 1989, she received an O. Henry Award for her short story "Unstable Ground".

She received a PEN Center USA Freedom to Write award in 2011 for Animo Pat Brown Charter High School's literary journal Truth.

References

External links
 

Living people
American soap opera writers
American television producers
American women television producers
American women screenwriters
American women television writers
Women soap opera writers
Year of birth missing (living people)
21st-century American women
American women bloggers
American bloggers